Paracalia is a genus of South American flowering plants in the groundsel tribe within the sunflower family.

 Species
 Paracalia jungioides (Hook. & Arn.) Cuatrec. - Peru
 Paracalia lopezii (M.O.Dillon & Sagást.) A.Correa - Peru
 Paracalia pentamera (Cuatrec.) Cuatrec. - Bolivia

References

Senecioneae
Asteraceae genera
Flora of South America